The Race Relations Act 1976 was established by the Parliament of the United Kingdom to prevent discrimination on the grounds of race. The scope of the legislation included discrimination on the grounds of race, colour, nationality, ethnic and national origin in the fields of employment, the provision of goods and services, education and public functions.

In the field of employment, section 7 of the Act extended protection to "contract workers", that is, someone who works (or is prevented from working) for a person but is employed not by that person ("the principal") but by another person, who supplies the worker under a contract between the principal and the worker's employer. Typically this clause protects the rights of agency workers to be protected from racial discrimination. This provision was reviewed in a 2010 legal case, Leeds City Council v Woodhouse and Another, in which the courts opted for "a broad reading" of section 7 and the type of employment relationship involved, "so as not to restrict the protection for contract workers". In this particular case it was confirmed that employees of an arms length housing management organisation were protected as contract workers even though the principal had no management control over how their employer dealt with its staff.

The Act also established the Commission for Racial Equality with a view to review the legislation, which was put in place to make sure the Act rules were followed.

The Act incorporated the earlier Race Relations Act 1965 and Race Relations Act 1968 and was later amended by the Race Relations Amendment Act 2000, notably imposing a statutory duty on public bodies to promote racial equality and to demonstrate that procedures to prevent race discrimination were effective.

The Act was repealed by the Equality Act 2010, which superseded and consolidated previous discrimination law in the UK.

See also 
 Equality and diversity (United Kingdom)
 Ethnic groups in the United Kingdom
Ethnic relations
UK employment discrimination law

References

External links
CRE page relating to race relations legislation
BBC report on the introduction of the race relations Acts

Anti-racism in the United Kingdom
United Kingdom Acts of Parliament 1976
Anti-discrimination law in the United Kingdom
Race relations in the United Kingdom